Paedophoropus is a genus of parasitic sea snails, marine gastropod mollusks in the family Eulimidae.

Species
 Paedophoropus dicoelobicus Ivanov, 1933

References

 Warén A. (1984) A generic revision of the family Eulimidae (Gastropoda, Prosobranchia). Journal of Molluscan Studies suppl. 13: 1-96.

External links
 To World Register of Marine Species

Eulimidae